Chen Ruili (born 23 August 1968) is a Chinese sailor. She competed in the women's 470 event at the 1988 Summer Olympics.

References

External links
 

1968 births
Living people
Chinese female sailors (sport)
Olympic sailors of China
Sailors at the 1988 Summer Olympics – 470
Place of birth missing (living people)
20th-century Chinese women